Sarcodon harrisonii is a species of tooth fungus in the family Bankeraceae. Found in the southeastern United States, it was described as new to science in 1985 by Richard Baird. The type collection was made near Asheville, North Carolina. Spores are more or less spherical, measuring 7–8 by 6–7.5 µm. S. harrisonii is similar in appearance to the Michigan species S. ustalis. The specific epithet honors Canadian mycologist Kenneth A. Harrison for his work on stipitate hydnums.

References

External links

Fungi described in 1985
Fungi of the United States
harrisonii
Fungi without expected TNC conservation status